The Stadion Dyskobolii Grodzisk Wielkopolski (English: Dyskobolia Grodzisk Wielkopolski Stadium) is a multi-use stadium in Grodzisk Wielkopolski, Poland.  The stadium is used mostly for football matches and is the home ground of Nasza Dyskobolia Grodzisk Wielkopolski and Warta Poznań (interim). The stadium was originally built in 1925 and can hold 5,383 spectators.

It was the home ground of Dyskobolia Grodzisk Wielkopolski, until the above-mentioned club was dissolved in 2015 and replaced with phoenix club Nasza Dyskobolia Grodzisk Wielkopolski.

References

External links
StadiumDB images

Grodzisk
Dyskobolia Grodzisk Wielkopolski
Sports venues in Greater Poland Voivodeship